Ball Lake is a lake located on Vancouver Island south of Lake Helen MacKenzie on Forbidden Plateau, Strathcona Provincial Park.

See also
List of lakes of British Columbia

References

Alberni Valley
Lakes of Vancouver Island
Comox Land District